Arnhem Presikhaaf is a railway station located in the neighborhood Presikhaaf of Arnhem, Netherlands. The station was opened on 28 September 1969 and is located on the Arnhem–Leeuwarden railway. The train services at this station are operated by Nederlandse Spoorwegen. The station is the easternmost station in Arnhem. A previous station called Plattenburg was very closely located to the location of the current station (from 1882 to 1905).

Train services

Bus services

Other stations in Arnhem
Arnhem Centraal
Arnhem Velperpoort
Arnhem Zuid

References

External links
NS website 
Dutch Public Transport journey planner 

Presikhaaf
Railway stations opened in 1969
Railway stations on the Staatslijn A
Railway stations on the IJssellijn
1969 establishments in the Netherlands
Railway stations in the Netherlands opened in the 20th century
Railway stations in the Netherlands opened in the 1960s